Endrick may refer to:

Endrick Water, river in Loch Lomond, Scotland
Forth and Endrick (ward), ward in Stirling Council, Scotland
Endrick River, river in New South Wales, Australia
Endrick (footballer, born 1995), full name Endrick dos Santos Parafita, Brazilian football midfielder for Penang
Endrick Felipe (born 2006), full name Endrick Felipe Moreira de Sousa, Brazilian football striker for Palmeiras